Andrew Chiang-Fung Liu (born March 15, 1947) is a Canadian mathematician. He is a professor emeritus in the Department of Mathematical and Statistical Sciences at the University of Alberta.

Liu was born in Guangzhou, and attended New Method College in Hong Kong.
He then did his undergraduate studies in mathematics at McGill University, and earned his Ph.D. in 1976 from the University of Alberta, under the supervision of Harvey Abbott, with a dissertation about hypergraphs.

He was the leader of the Canadian team to the International Mathematical Olympiad in 2000 (South Korea) and 2003 (Japan) and acts as vice-president of the Tournament of Towns.

Books
 2001 Hungarian Problem Book III (1929–1943), Mathematical Association of America
 1998 Chinese Mathematics Competitions and Olympiads Book 1 (1981-1993), Australian Mathematics Trust 
 2005 Chinese Mathematics Competitions and Olympiads Book 2 (1993-2001), Australian Mathematics Trust
 2008 The Alberta High School Math Competitions (1957–2006), Mathematical Association of America
 2009 Problems from Murray Klamkin, Mathematical Association of America, with Bruce Shawyer
 2009 International Mathematics Tournament of the Towns Book (2002-2007), Australian Mathematics Trust, with Peter Taylor
 2011 Hungarian Problem Book IV (1947–1963), Mathematical Association of America, with Robert Barrington-Leigh
 2014 Upper Elementary School Mathematics, Chiu Chang Mathematics Publishers, Taipei
 2014 Classical Geometry, Wiley, with Ed Leonard, Ted Lewis and George Tokarsky
 2015 Arithmetical Wonderland, Mathematical Association of America
 2016 Soviet Union Mathematical Olympiad (1961–1992), Mathematical Association of America
 2018 Chinese Mathematics Competitions and Olympiads Book 3 (2001-2009), Australian Mathematics Trust, with Yunhao Fu and Zhichao Li
 2018 S.M.A.R.T. Circle Overview, Springer Nature
 2018 S.M.A.R.T. Circle Projects, Springer Nature
 2018 S.M.A.R.T. Circle Minicourses, Springer Nature
 2020 The Puzzles of Nobuyuki Yoshigahara, Springer Nature, with George Sicherman and Takayuki Yoshigahara
 2020 Grade Five Competition from the Leningrad Mathematical Olympiad, Springer Nature, with Kseniya Garaschuk
 2021 Solomon Golomb’s Course in Undergraduate Combinatorics, Spring Nature, with Solomon Golomb

Awards
 Pacific Institute for the Mathematical Sciences Educational Prize, (2010)
 Deborah and Franklin Tepper-Haimo Award from the Mathematical Association of America (2004)
 Adrien Pouliot Award from the Canadian Mathematical Society (2003)
 Distinguished Teaching Award  from the Pacific Northwest Section of the Mathematical Association of America (2002)
 Canadian University Professor of the Year, Canadian Council for the Advancement of Education and Council for Advancement and Support of Education (1998)
 Distinguished Educators Award, Ontario Institute for Studies in Education (1998)

References

Living people
Canadian mathematicians
Mathematics educators
McGill University Faculty of Science alumni
Scientists from Edmonton
University of Alberta alumni
Academic staff of the University of Alberta
Canadian people of Chinese descent
1947 births